Amaxia erythrophleps is a moth of the family Erebidae. It was described by George Hampson in 1901. It is found in the upper Amazon basin.

References

Moths described in 1901
Amaxia
Moths of South America